Njomgang Isaac  was a Cameroonian politician and administrator. He was the First black local Cameroonian Administrator appointed in Dschang Post Colonial Administration. He was born in 1931 at Tsep, Batoufam, West Region, Cameroon, and died in 2008.

In 1954, the Arrondissement of Dschang in West Region was administered by a mixed group of white colonial Europeans (Messieurs Mouterde Emmanuel and Gauger Robert until 1959). They were replaced by Isaac, who was then the first local Cameroonian administrator of Dschang.

Education
Isaac received his education at the local school of Batoufam and the high school in Dschang. He received his undergraduate education in Nkongsamba's College. Isaac was then selected to study public law and public administration at the Cours De Selection of Public Administrators in Dschang. Men entering the public administrators' education at this time were generally selected carefully by the colonial administrators themselves; they required high ability, strong leadership and a sense of dedication.

Government service
From 1958 to 1976, Isaac was a prefect (in French, préfet, meaning the head of the capital of a department). There are 58 departments in Cameroon. As in the French model, the capital of a department is called the préfecture. A department is under the authority of a prefect, appointed by presidential decree, meaning that the prefect upholds both the authority of the state and implicitly the authority of the region at the local level.

Isaac was appointed by the Cameroonian President Ahmadou Ahidjo:

Prefect of the Department of Bamboutos - 1961–1964
Prefect of Haut Nkam Department - 1964–1966
Prefect Boumba and Ngoko Department - 1966–1971
Prefect of Mefou Department - 1971–1973
Prefect of Mbam Department - 1973–1976

In 1974, he was appointed Director of Territorial Affairs at the Ministry of Territorial Administration in the Ahidjo's government.
 
In December 1977, Isaac was appointed General Inspector of Territorial Affairs at the Ministry of Territorial Administration in Ahidjo's government with the same ranking of a minister.

Personal life
He was married with nine children.

References

 
Ministere de l'Administration du Territoire Cameroun - Archive

Cameroonian politicians
1931 births
Living people
People from West Region (Cameroon)